Irina Sumnikova (born 15 October 1964 in Minsk, Belarusian SSR) is a Russian former basketball player who competed in the 1988 Summer Olympics, in the 1992 Summer Olympics, in the 1996 Summer Olympics, and in the 2000 Summer Olympics.

References

1964 births
Living people
Basketball players from Minsk
Belarusian women's basketball players
Russian women's basketball players
Olympic basketball players of the Soviet Union
Olympic basketball players of the Unified Team
Olympic basketball players of Russia
Basketball players at the 1988 Summer Olympics
Basketball players at the 1992 Summer Olympics
Basketball players at the 1996 Summer Olympics
Basketball players at the 2000 Summer Olympics
Olympic bronze medalists for the Soviet Union
Olympic gold medalists for the Unified Team
Olympic medalists in basketball
Soviet women's basketball players
Medalists at the 1992 Summer Olympics
Medalists at the 1988 Summer Olympics